The 6th Louisiana Field Battery was an artillery unit recruited from volunteers in Louisiana that fought in the Confederate States Army during the American Civil War. The Grosse Tete Artillery organized in December 1863 using men detached from the 1st Louisiana Regular Battery and exchanged prisoners from the Pointe Coupee Artillery. In April and May 1864, the battery served during the Red River campaign and fought at Mansfield, Pleasant Hill, Blair's Landing, and Monett's Ferry. In May 1864, the unit helped capture the Union river transport City Belle at Wilson's Landing, helped destroy the USS Covington and USS Signal, and fought at Mansura and Yellow Bayou. The battery surrendered on 1 June 1865 while at Alexandria, Louisiana.

See also
List of Louisiana Confederate Civil War units
Louisiana in the Civil War

Notes

References
 
 

Units and formations of the Confederate States Army from Louisiana
1862 establishments in Louisiana
Military units and formations established in 1862
1865 disestablishments in Louisiana
Military units and formations disestablished in 1865